John Carlyle may refer to:

John Carlyle (merchant) (1720–1780), Scottish merchant in Virginia
John Aitken Carlyle (1801–1879), Scottish doctor and brother of Thomas Carlyle
Johnny Carlyle (1929–2017), British ice hockey player and coach

John Carlyle, a character in the 2013 film Elysium

See also
John Carlile (disambiguation)
John Carlisle (disambiguation)